Shirley Rose Prestia (August 18, 1947 – October 8, 2011) was an American actress. She guest starred in a number of notable television series including Family Ties, Cheers, St. Elsewhere, The Golden Girls, The Facts of Life, 227, Mr. Belvedere, Babylon 5, L.A. Law, NYPD Blue, Step by Step, The Practice and among other series. Prestia also had recurring roles on the sitcoms Home Improvement (as Delores) and Dharma & Greg (as Janet).

She appeared in the films Final Analysis (1992), Hoffa (1992), Species (1995), Leave It to Beaver (1997), Wag the Dog (1997) and What Women Want (2000).

Life and early career
Prestia was born in New Orleans, Louisiana. She graduated from Mount Carmel Academy high school. She is an alumna of California State University, Chico and graduated with a Bachelor of Arts degree in Theater Arts. Prestia was also one of the original members of The Groundlings comedy troupe.

Later years and death
Prestia was diagnosed with brain cancer circa 2004. Due to the illness, she retired from acting, with her last acting credit appearing in the pilot episode of the sitcom The War at Home in 2005. She died on October 8, 2011 at age 64, in her hometown of New Orleans, after eight years of living with the disease.

Filmography

References

External links

1947 births
2011 deaths
20th-century American actresses
21st-century American actresses
Actresses from New Orleans
American film actresses
American stage actresses
American television actresses
California State University, Chico alumni
Deaths from brain tumor